Sullivan County is a county located in the U.S. state of Tennessee on its northeast border. As of the 2020 census, the population was 158,163. Its county seat is Blountville.

Sullivan County is part of the Kingsport–Johnson City–Bristol, TN-VA Metropolitan Statistical Area, which is a component of the Kingsport–Johnson City–Bristol, TN-VA Combined Statistical Area, commonly known as the "Tri-Cities" region.

Sullivan is Tennessee's second-oldest county; it was established in 1779 when the area was still part of North Carolina. From 1784 to 1788, it was part of the extra-legal State of Franklin.

History
Sullivan County was created in 1779 from a portion of Washington County, and named for John Sullivan, a Patriot general in the Revolutionary War.  Long Island of the Holston in Kingsport was long an important center for the Cherokee, who occupied much of this territory.  Later in 1761 the British colonists built Fort Robinson on Long Island, following the fall of Fort Loudoun further to the south. This attracted other settlers, and the Sullivan area became one of the earliest areas of Tennessee to be settled by European Americans.

As political tensions rose prior to the American Civil War, Sullivan County was one of the few East Tennessee counties to support secession. It became known as the Little Confederacy. In Tennessee's June 1861 referendum, the county voted 1,586 to 627 in favor of secession.

Geography
The western portion of the county lies within the Ridge-and-Valley Appalachians, which are characterized by long, narrow ridges roughly oriented northeast-to-southwest. The northeastern end of Bays Mountain, part of the Ridge-and-Valley range, rises southwest of Kingsport. The eastern portion of the county lies within the Blue Ridge Mountains.

In Kingsport, the South Fork Holston River and the North Fork Holston River join to form the Holston River, one of the tributaries of the Tennessee River.  The Watauga River, a tributary of the South Fork Holston, forms part of Sullivan's boundary with Washington County to the south. The North Fork Holston forms part of Sullivan's boundary with Hawkins County to the west. Fort Patrick Henry Dam and Boone Dam both create large artificial lakes along the South Fork Holston southeast of Kingsport.

Blountville, Sullivan's county seat, is Tennessee's only unincorporated county seat.

Morrell Cave
Morrell Cave (also known as Worleys Cave) is a Tennessee State Natural Area.

During the Civil War, the cave was a major source of saltpeter, the main ingredient of gunpowder.  Significant evidence of this mining activity remains in the cave, including evidence of large amounts of saltpeter-bearing dirt having been removed, pick marks in the dirt, and an elaborate system of trails used by the miners. Cave historian Marion O. Smith has determined that two companies of the Confederate Nitre and Mining Bureau, District No. 7, were active in Sullivan County.

Adjacent counties and independent city
Scott County, Virginia (north)
Washington County, Virginia (northeast)
Bristol, Virginia (northeast)
Johnson County (east)
Carter County (southeast)
Washington County (south)
Hawkins County (west)

National protected areas
Appalachian Trail (part)
Cherokee National Forest (part)

State protected areas
Morrell's Cave State Natural Area
Rocky Mount State Historic Site
Warriors' Path State Park

Other protected areas
Bays Mountain Park (part)

Major highways

Demographics

2020 census

As of the 2020 United States census, there were 158,163 people, 68,560 households, and 44,284 families residing in the county.

2010 census
As of the 2010 United States Census, there were 156,281 people living in the county. 95.5% were White, 0.6% Black or African American, 0.4% Asian, 0.2% Native American, 2.2% of some other race and 1.0% of two or more races. 4.8% were Hispanic or Latino (of any race).

2000 census
As of the census of 2000, there were 153,048 people, 63,556 households, and 44,806 families living in the county.  The population density was 371 people per square mile (143/km2).  There were 69,052 housing units at an average density of 167 per square mile (65/km2).  The racial makeup of the county was 96.55% White, 1.89% Black or African American, 0.22% Native American, 0.43% Asian, 0.01% Pacific Islander, 0.21% from other races, and 0.69% from two or more races.  0.71% of the population were Hispanic or Latino of any race.

There were 63,556 households, out of which 28.40% had children under the age of 18 living with them, 57.10% were married couples living together, 10.20% had a female householder with no husband present, and 29.50% were non-families according to the United States Census Bureau. Of 63,556 households, 1,915 are unmarried partner households: 1,702 heterosexual, 97 same-sex male, 116 same-sex female. 26.40% of all households were made up of individuals, and 11.10% had someone living alone who was 65 years of age or older.  The average household size was 2.36 and the average family size was 2.84.

In the county, the population was spread out, with 21.80% under the age of 18, 7.30% from 18 to 24, 28.40% from 25 to 44, 26.50% from 45 to 64, and 15.90% who were 65 years of age or older.  The median age was 40 years. For every 100 females, there were 93.30 males.  For every 100 females age 18 and over, there were 90.20 males.

The median income for a household in the county was $33,529, and the median income for a family was $41,025. Males had a median income of $31,204 versus $21,653 for females. The per capita income for the county was $19,202.  About 9.70% of families and 12.90% of the population were below the poverty line, including 17.10% of those under age 18 and 11.90% of those age 65 or over.

Government
Sullivan County, like all of Tennessee outside Nashville and the extreme southwest, is heavily Republican, but, unlike most of East Tennessee, has not voted consistently Republican since the Civil War. Being one of only six counties in East Tennessee and the only county in Northeast Tennessee to support the Confederacy, Sullivan County mostly voted Democratic between the end of the Civil War and the mid-20th century, the only county in East Tennessee to do so. The last Democratic presidential candidate to carry Sullivan County was southerner Jimmy Carter in 1976.

Richard Venable is the county mayor. The county commission has 24 members. Before 2010, commissioners were elected on a nonpartisan basis, but Sullivan County's commission election became a partisan election in 2010 after the county Republican Party decided to conduct a primary election for commission seats. The county elections also cover Circuit Court Judges, Chancellor, Criminal Court Judge, District Attorney General, Public Defender, County Trustee, General Session Judge, Sherriff, Circuit Court Clerk, County Clerk, Register of Deeds, Commissioner of Highways, County Attorney, and School Board.

Current composition of the Sullivan County Commission

2022
The primary election took place on May 3rd, 2022, with the general election concurring with the State/Federal general election on August 4th. The following incumbents did not run for re-election, Randy C. Morrell (District 1), Mark Hutton (District 2), and Judy Blalock (District 6). Angie Stanley retired from her seat in District 7 to unsuccessfully challenge incumbent mayor Richard Veneable in a primary. Both of the incumbents from District 9 (Downton Kingsport, Tennessee retired, Collette George (who also serves on the Kingsport BMA [her son was running for county mayor]) and Doug Woods.

Incumbents who lost re-election
The following incumbents lost re-nomination:
District 2 - Mark Vance (ran for county mayor, dropped out, lost renomination)
District 6 - Todd Broughton (placed 4th in top 3 advance)
District 6 - Terry Harkleroad (placed 6th in top 3 advance) 

No incumbents lost re-election in the general election. Most races were uncontested (the republicans were the only ones on the ballot), except District 7 in which Lori Love (wife of perennial candidate Avril Love, and Democratic State Executive Committeewoman) garnered 15% of the vote, and District 9, Independent Candidate Randall Bowers garnered 15% if the vote.

Sherriff
Sullivan County Sherriff Jeff Cassidy first ran for the position in 2018 as an independent beating out controversial Republican Wayne Anderson. He ran for re-election in 2022 as a Republican. Alongside Circuit Court Judge District 2, Part I, John S. McLellan III, who was serving as a Democrat, by changing both of their political affiliations to Republican in this election, they have effectively ended

County Mayoral Election
The election for County Mayor was between incumbent Richard S. Veneable (Republican), Val Edwards George (Independent [Conservative]), and Bobby Weaver (Independent [Conservative])

Law enforcement
The Sullivan County Sheriffs Office has a staff of 260 deputies, corrections officers, and support personnel. The department also staffs a 24-7 9-1-1 dispatch center that provides dispatching for the sheriff's office, Bluff City Police Department, Sullivan County Fire Departments, and Sullivan County EMS. The dispatch center receives approximately 100,000 calls each year.

 the sheriff is Jeff Cassidy, who won election in 2018 after a very contentious race against previous sheriff Wayne Anderson. Anderson apologized after sending text messages to a corrections employee that threatened to fire anyone who voted for his opponent, Jeff Cassidy, and saying that department employees would urinate on Cassidy's grave.

A 2022 lawsuit claims that sheriff's deputies retaliated against a woman who had asked them to wear face masks due to the COVID-19 pandemic.

Since the organization was established, 10 members of the sheriff's office have died in the line of duty.

Communities

Cities
Bluff City
Bristol
Johnson City (mostly in Washington County and a small portion in Carter County)
Kingsport (partial)

Census-designated places

Bloomingdale
Blountville (county seat)
Colonial Heights
Orebank
Spurgeon (partial)
Sullivan Gardens
Walnut Hill

Unincorporated communities

 Arcadia
 Boring
 Buffalo
 Cedar Grove (east)
 Cedar Grove (west)
 Fordtown
 Holston Valley
 Lynn Garden
 Morrison City 
 Piney Flats

Education
The three school districts are Bristol Tennessee City Schools, Kingsport City School District, and Sullivan County School District.

Notable people
 Besse Cooper, (1896-2012), age 116, the world's oldest living person from June 21, 2011, until her death on December 4, 2012.
 Austin Augustus King (1802–1870), American lawyer, politician, and military officer. Tenth governor of Missouri and a one-term United States congressman.
 John Smith, early leader in the Restoration Movement.

See also
National Register of Historic Places listings in Sullivan County, Tennessee
Rader v. State (1880)

References

Further reading
Sullivan County, Tennessee Veterans History. Nashville: Turner Publishing Company (2001).

External links

NETWORKS - Sullivan Partnership
Sullivan County Dept. of Education
Sullivan Co, TN American Local History Network
Sullivan County TNGenWeb

 
1779 establishments in North Carolina
Counties of Appalachia
East Tennessee
Kingsport–Bristol metropolitan area
Populated places established in 1779
Second Amendment sanctuaries in Tennessee
State of Franklin